In information theory and statistics, Kullback's inequality is a lower bound on the Kullback–Leibler divergence expressed in terms of the large deviations rate function.  If P and Q are probability distributions on the real line, such that P is absolutely continuous with respect to Q, i.e. P << Q, and whose first moments exist, then

The Cramér–Rao bound is a corollary of this result.

Proof
Let P and Q be probability distributions (measures) on the real line, whose first moments exist, and such that P << Q. Consider the natural exponential family of Q given by

for every measurable set A, where  is the moment-generating function of Q.  (Note that Q0 = Q.)  Then

By Gibbs' inequality we have  so that

Simplifying the right side, we have, for every real θ where 

Taking the supremum completes the process of convex conjugation and yields the rate function:

Corollary: the Cramér–Rao bound

Start with Kullback's inequality
Let Xθ be a family of probability distributions on the real line indexed by the real parameter θ, and satisfying certain regularity conditions.  Then

Left side
The left side of this inequality can be simplified as follows:

which is half the Fisher information of the parameter θ.

Right side
The right side of the inequality can be developed as follows:

This supremum is attained at a value of t=τ where the first derivative of the cumulant-generating function is  but we have  so that

Moreover,

Putting both sides back together
We have:

which can be rearranged as:

See also
 Kullback–Leibler divergence
 Cramér–Rao bound
 Fisher information
 Large deviations theory
 Convex conjugate
 Rate function
 Moment-generating function

Notes and references

Information theory
Statistical inequalities
Estimation theory